John D. Szoka (born October 21, 1954) is an American politician who served as a member of the North Carolina House of Representatives from the 45th district from 2013 to 2023. A Republican, was first elected in November 2012 and assumed office in January 2013.

Early life and education 
Szoka was born in Cleveland and raised in Maple Heights, Ohio. After graduating from Maple Heights High School, he earned a Bachelor of Science degree in engineering from the United States Military Academy and a Master of Science in operations research from the University of Texas at Austin, where he specialized in mathematics and computer modelling.

Career
Szoka served in the United States Army from 1976 to 1996. Since 2011 he has worked as a branch manager for Certainty Home Loans. He was elected to the North Carolina House of Representatives in November 2012 and assumed office in January 2013.

In November 2021, Szoka declared his candidacy for North Carolina's 4th congressional district in the 2022 election.

Electoral history

2020

2018

2016

2014

2012

2010

References

External links
 Representative John Szoka (Republican, 2017-2018 Session) - North Carolina General Assembly
 Szoka for NC House

Living people
1954 births
Politicians from Cleveland
People from Cuyahoga County, Ohio
People from Fayetteville, North Carolina
United States Military Academy alumni
University of Texas at Austin alumni
21st-century American politicians
Republican Party members of the North Carolina House of Representatives